Stoney Street is an historic street in Nottingham City Centre between High Pavement and Carlton Street.

History
The street is medieval and formed the north to south spine of the Saxon town.

For many years the street was a cul-de-sac, terminating before the current junction with High Pavement. It was a residential street by the eighteenth century, containing some fine mansions including Plumptre House and Pierrepont House.

During the 19th century, the residential properties were replaced by Lace factories and these buildings still dominate the street.

Notable buildings
2 and 2A, 2 houses, early 19th century Now houses and shops. 
3, Warehouse, 1896 by Richard Charles Sutton Now a fish bar.
7, Old Angel Public House, dated ca. 1800, then 1878 by Lawrence Bright, and 1883 by H Walker.
8 to 14, Adams Buildings, 1855 by Thomas Chambers Hine
16, Birkin Brothers Warehouse, 1872 by Robert Evans and William Jolley 
19, Warehouse, 
21 to 27, Warehouse, 19th century, with additions in 1910 by William Dymock Pratt 
34 and 34A, Eastgate House, Warehouse, 1850-60 
37, Warehouse, 1894 by John Howitt 
39, Warehouse, 19th century, altered in 1905 by Gilbert Smith Doughty
47, Mills and Gibbs Warehouse, 19th century, altered in 1902 by Gilbert Smith Doughty
49 and 51, Warehouse, 1883 by Richard Charles Sutton

References

Buildings and structures in Nottingham
Streets in Nottingham